The 2018 Illinois gubernatorial election took place on November 6, 2018, to elect the Governor of Illinois, concurrently with the 2018 Illinois general election and other midterm elections. Incumbent Republican Governor Bruce Rauner ran for re-election to a second term in office, but was defeated by Democratic nominee J. B. Pritzker.

This was the second consecutive Illinois gubernatorial election in which the incumbent unsuccessfully sought re-election, and was also the first time that two consecutive governors have been elected without prior public office experience. Rauner was one of two incumbent Republican governors to be defeated for re-election in 2018, the other being Scott Walker in neighboring Wisconsin,  who had lost narrowly to Tony Evers. In addition, Rauner had the worst defeat for an incumbent governor in any state since Ernie Fletcher's defeat in Kentucky's 2007 election. Rauner's 38.8% of the vote was the worst performance for an incumbent Illinois Governor since 1912; he also received the lowest raw percentage of the vote for a Republican nominee since 1912.

Ultimately, Rauner remained on the ballot, and lost in the most lopsided gubernatorial election since Jim Edgar was reelected in 1994. With Pritzker winning by a margin of 15.7%, this was the biggest gubernatorial margin of victory for a Democrat since 1932.  This was the first gubernatorial election in the state since 2002 where the Democrat won a majority of the vote.

Election information
The primaries and general elections coincided with those for federal congressional races and those for other state offices. The election was part of the 2018 Illinois elections. Primary elections were held on March 20.

Turnout

For the primary election, turnout was 25.76%, with 2,046,710 votes cast. For the general election, turnout was 56.15%, with 4,547,657 votes cast.

Democratic primary

Candidates

Nominated
 J. B. Pritzker, venture capitalist
 Running mate: Juliana Stratton, State Representative

Eliminated in primary
 Daniel Biss, state senator
 Running mate: Litesa Wallace, state representative
Former running mate: Carlos Ramirez-Rosa, Chicago Alderman
 Bob Daiber, Madison County Regional Superintendent of Schools
 Running mate: Jonathan W. Todd, social worker
 Tio Hardiman, former director of CeaseFire and candidate for governor in 2014
 Running mate: Patricia Avery, president and CEO of the Champaign County chapter of the NAACP.
 Chris Kennedy, former chairman of the University of Illinois Board of Trustees and member of the Kennedy family
Running mate: Ra Joy, nonprofit executive
 Robert Marshall, physician and perennial candidate
 Running mate: Dennis Cole

Removed from ballot
 Terry Getz, corrections officer (filed on November 29, 2017, but did so without a running mate or submitting any signatures)

Withdrew
 Scott Drury, state representative (running for Attorney General)
 Running mate: Alex Hirsch, political operative
 Alex Paterakis, civil engineer and business owner
 Ameya Pawar, Chicago Alderman
 Running mate: Tyrone Coleman, mayor of Cairo

Declined
 Cheri Bustos, U.S. representative
 Arne Duncan, former United States Secretary of Education
 Dick Durbin, U.S. senator
 Mike Frerichs, Illinois Treasurer
 Valerie Jarrett, former Senior Advisor to the President
 Robin Kelly, U.S. representative
 Lisa Madigan, Illinois Attorney General
 Andy Manar, state senator
 Barack Obama, former President of the United States and U.S. senator
 Michelle Obama, former First Lady of the United States
 Penny Pritzker, former United States Secretary of Commerce
 Pat Quinn, former governor of Illinois (Ran for Attorney General)
 Heather Steans, state senator
 Kurt Summers, Chicago city treasurer

Endorsements

Forums
The Illinois LGBTQ Forum: The Democratic Candidates for Governor was held on December 6, 2017, and organized by Affinity Community Services, the Association of Latinos/as Motivating Action (ALMA), the Equality Illinois Institute, and Pride Action Tank. Candidates who attended included Daniel Biss, Tio Hardiman, Ameya Pawar, J. B. Pritzker, and Chris Kennedy.

Whitney Young High School hosted the first student-run gubernatorial debate in the United States on October 4, 2017. All 7 then current candidates attended, meaning Daniel Biss, Bob Daiber, Tio Hardiman, Chris Kennedy, Alex Paterakis, Ameya Pawar, and J. B. Pritzker.

The Illinois chapter of progressive advocacy organization Our Revolution sponsored a forum at the Chicago Teacher's Union headquarters on October 8, 2017. Candidates voiced similar opinions on single-payer health care, gun control, and the minimum wage, but differed on a hypothetical state deal with Amazon and relationships with powerful Illinois Speaker Mike Madigan.

The Democratic candidates held their first televised debate on January 23. All six candidates met again a week later on January 30. The debate was not televised but was uploaded to WSIL-TV's YouTube channel.

Another debate was held on February 21, which was hosted by the University of Illinois Springfield. Chris Kennedy did not attend due to a back injury, although all five other candidates participated. Another major debate took place on March 1. It involved issues such as gun control, Blagojevich's tapes, sexual harassment, and relatability. Another debate took place the next day in Springfield. The topics involved Madigan, sexual harassment, among other issues. The spotlight remained on the top contenders: Chris Kennedy, J.B Pritzker, and Daniel Biss.

Pritzker was criticized for refusing to commit to attend the only live-television debate planned outside the Chicago media market, prompting the debate's cancellation. Biss and Kennedy gathered petition signatures to encourage the debate's continuation, and Biss commented that "JB is borrowing a page from the billionaire playbook, avoiding debates and shunning reporters who ask tough questions." Another debate took place on March 14, revolving around topics including Pritzker's newly reported offshore holdings, Illinois House Speaker Mike Madigan, and education. Kennedy and Biss both attacked Pritzker on the offshore businesses, Kennedy "saying it's like a job interview, and Pritzker lying to get the job", and Biss saying "Pritzker did that to avoid taxes".

Polling

Results

Pritzker won 98 of Illinois' counties. Kennedy and Biss both won two counties each.

Republican primary

Candidates

Nominated
 Bruce Rauner, incumbent governor
 Running mate: Evelyn Sanguinetti, incumbent lieutenant governor

Eliminated in primary
 Jeanne Ives, State Representative
 Running mate: Richard Morthland, Rock Island County board member and former state representative

Withdrew
 William J. Kelly, radio host and perennial candidate (running as an independent)
 Running mate: Brian Leggero, candidate for Mayor of Rockford in 2017
 Former running mate: Ray Tranchant, immigration activist

Endorsements

Campaign
A November 2017 Capitol Fax/We Ask America poll found that 83% of Republican voters have never heard of Ives. Ives' campaign's fourth-quarter fundraising totals were around $500,000. On February 28, 2018, Ives' campaign released a new book entitled The Governor You Don't Know: The Other Side of Bruce Rauner, authored by Chicago GOP chairman and Ives campaign chairman Chris Cleveland with a foreword by conservative State Representative Tom Morrison.

Rauner and Ives held their first and only scheduled forum on January 29, before the Chicago Tribune editorial board." Rauner largely ignored his opponent and focused on attacking Speaker Mike Madigan, comparing him to his likely Democratic challenger, J. B. Pritzker. Ives, on the other hand, attacked Rauner for being an ineffective governor and alienating social conservatives. Shortly after the debate, conservative Lake Forest businessman Richard Uihlein donated $500,000 to Ives' campaign.

Rauner and Ives were invited by the University of Illinois Springfield to debate a second time; Rauner declined the invitation.

Ives released an ad titled "Thank You, Bruce Rauner" on February 3, 2018, in an attempt to challenge her opponent's commitment to conservative values. Her ad featured actors outfitted to portray a transgender woman, an anti-fascist protester wearing a hood and a bandana over his face, a member of the Chicago Teachers Union and a Women's March activist. After Ives' ad made its rounds on the internet, advocacy groups, some Republicans and Democrats lashed out against Ives, calling her video bigoted and offensive. The ad increased Ives's profile and name recognition. Three Chicago-area newspaper editorial boards came out against the ad: the Chicago Tribune said "The portrayals are demeaning;" the Daily Herald said that Ives should take down the ad, which "attacks people of Illinois, not opponent", and the Chicago Sun-Times wrote, "Jeanne Ives goes for the bully vote with her TV ad."

Polling

Results

Despite a 14% decrease in Republican primary votes cast, Rauner increased his overall vote total by 9% compared to the 2014 primary. In 2018, he managed to capture a narrow majority of the votes, with 51.5%, in his victory over conservative Ives. By comparison, in 2014 Rauner only received 40.2% of the primary vote in his narrow win victory over Kirk Dillard, Bill Brady, and Dan Rutherford.

In 2018, Rauner did well in central Illinois compared to the Republican primary four years earlier, when he managed 30% in the downstate region and finished 2nd to Kirk Dillard. In 2018, he carried the region with 52%.

However, the result was still considered surprisingly close, and indicated widespread dissatisfaction with Rauner's governorship among more conservative Republicans.

Third parties and independents
In order to qualify as an established party in Illinois, a candidate for said party must earn at least 5% of the vote in a statewide election. This last occurred in 2006, when Rich Whitney won 10% of the vote, allowing the Illinois Green Party to achieve such status. Established party status comes with benefits. For example, candidates of an established party needs only 5,000 voter signatures on its petitions to gain ballot access. For non-established parties this number is approximately 25,000.

For the 2018 election, non-established parties do not need to run a full slate in order to qualify for ballot access.

Conservative
Sam McCann, a longtime intraparty opponent of Bruce Rauner, resigned from the Republican Caucus to run for governor as a member of the newly created Conservative Party.

Candidates
 Sam McCann, state senator
 Running mate: Aaron Merreighn, activist and United States Marine Corps veteran

Libertarian
Kash Jackson was the Libertarian nominee. Libertarian nominees for governor, other statewide offices, and the General Assembly were chosen by the Libertarian Party of Illinois at a state convention on March 3, 2018, in Bloomington, Illinois. Jackson appeared on the ballot.

Candidates
 Kash Jackson, navy veteran and activist
Running mate: Sanj Mohip

Endorsements

Unsuccessful
 Matthew C. Scaro, entrepreneur and Libertarian activist
 Jon Stewart, retired professional wrestler, Republican candidate for the state house in 1998 and Republican candidate for IL-05 in 2009

Independents

Removed from ballot
 Mary Vann-Metcalf
 Gregg Moore
Magistrale Morgan
 Dock Walls, perennial candidate
Jim Tobin, founder of Taxpayers United of America

Withdrew
 William J. Kelly, radio host and perennial candidate (subsequently ran on Constitution Party ticket, then withdrew)
 Running mate: Brian Leggero, candidate for Mayor of Rockford in 2017

Constitution

Nominee
William J. Kelly was nominated for governor and Chad Koppie, a member of the Kane County Regional Board of School Trustees, were chosen to run as the gubernatorial ticket of the Illinois Constitution Party. However, on June 5, 2018, Kelly dropped out and endorsed the third party campaign of Sam McCann.

Withdrew
 William J. Kelly, radio host and perennial candidate (endorsed Sam McCann)
 Randy Stufflebeam, chairman of the Illinois Constitution Party (endorsed William J. Kelly)

Green Party
The Green Party ran a slate of statewide candidates in 2006 and 2010, but failed to be placed on the ballot in 2014 and declined to run any statewide candidates in 2018.

General election
Bruce Rauner had been rated as one of, if not the most, vulnerable governor running for re-election in 2018 by Politico and the National Journal. Following his surprisingly narrow primary win, Rauner offered former state senator Karen McConnaughay, attorney general nominee Erika Harold, Chicago Cubs co-owner and Republican National Committee Finance Chair Todd Ricketts and Illinois Republican Party Committeeman Richard Porter the chance to replace him on the ticket, with the promise that he would continue to fully fund the campaign using his personal wealth. Rauner consistently trailed Pritzker in the polls by large margins, and the race was rated as a likely Democratic win by all major election prognosticators.

Endorsements

Debates

Predictions

Fundraising

Polling

with Jeanne Ives and J. B. Pritzker

with Bruce Rauner and Chris Kennedy

with Bruce Rauner and Daniel Biss

with Bruce Rauner and generic Democrat

with Jeanne Ives and Chris Kennedy

with Bruce Rauner and Dick Durbin

Results
Pritzker only won 16 out of Illinois's 102 counties. However, those counties account for more than half of the state's total population. In the end, the election was not close with the Pritzker/Stratton ticket defeating the Rauner/Sanguinetti ticket by almost 16 percentage points. Pritzker won the traditionally Democratic Cook County which includes the Chicago Metropolitan Area. Pritzker won in all but one of Chicago's collar counties, which used to be more of a tossup in years prior. Pritzker also did well in other cities such as East Saint Louis and Champaign, and narrowly won in Peoria. Rauner did well in most rural areas of the state, but it was not enough to put a dent into Pritzker's lead. Pritzker and Stratton were sworn in on January 14, 2019.

See also
2018 Illinois elections

Notes

References

External links
Candidates at Vote Smart
Candidates at Ballotpedia

Official campaign websites
Kash Jackson (L) for Governor
Sam McCann (Conservative) for Governor
J. B. Pritzker (D) for Governor
Bruce Rauner (R) for Governor

2018
Illinois
Gubernatorial